Sun Laimiao (born April 8, 1981 in Chuzhou, Anhui) is a Chinese handball player who competed at the 2004 Summer Olympics.

In 2004, she finished eighth with the Chinese team in the women's competition. She played five matches and scored two goals.

External links
Profile

1981 births
Living people
Handball players at the 2004 Summer Olympics
Handball players at the 2008 Summer Olympics
Olympic handball players of China
Chinese female handball players
People from Chuzhou
Sportspeople from Anhui
Handball players at the 2006 Asian Games
Asian Games competitors for China
21st-century Chinese women